Bazus-Neste is a commune in the Hautes-Pyrénées department in southwestern France.

Geography
The commune Bazus-Neste was formerly included in the country of the Four Valleys, the diocese of Comminges. The commune is just 1640 yards downstream from the first foothills of the Pyrenees

Population

See also
Communes of the Hautes-Pyrénées department

References

Communes of Hautes-Pyrénées